This edition of the 2017 Sudamérica Rugby Women's Sevens was held in Villa Carlos Paz, Córdoba, Argentina from 18 to 19 February. Despite losing to Brazil in the final, Argentina still got to play at the 2017 USA Women's Sevens in Las Vegas because Brazil was already in the World Rugby Women's Sevens Series. Argentina and Colombia also qualified to compete in the Hong Kong Sevens Qualifier Tournament for the 2017–18 World Rugby Women's Sevens Series. This was Brazil's 13th Sudamérica title.

Teams

Pool stage

Pool A

Pool B

Finals

Cup Quarterfinals

5th–7th Place Playoff

Final Standings

References 

2017 in women's rugby union
2017 rugby sevens competitions
Rugby sevens competitions in South America
2017 in South American rugby union
February 2017 sports events in South America